The United States Senate Judiciary Subcommittee on Competition Policy, Antitrust and Consumer Rights is one of eight subcommittees within the Senate Judiciary Committee. It was previously known as the Subcommittee on Antitrust, Competition Policy and Consumer Rights. The Subcommittee's counterpart in the House of Representatives is the House Judiciary Subcommittee on Antitrust, Commercial and Administrative Law.

Jurisdiction
According to its webpage:

 Oversight of antitrust and competition policy, including the Sherman, Clayton, and Federal Trade Commission Acts;
 Oversight of antitrust enforcement and competition policy at the Justice Department;
 Oversight of antitrust enforcement and competition policy at the Federal Trade Commission;
 Oversight of competition policy at other federal agencies.

Members, 118th Congress

Historical subcommittee rosters

117th Congress

116th Congress

External links
 
 Govtrack.us page on subcommittee

Judiciary Competition